The Flag Lieutenant is a 1926 British war film directed by Maurice Elvey and starring Henry Edwards, Lilian Oldland and Dorothy Seacombe. It is based on the play The Flag Lieutenant by W.P. Drury. Its sets were designed by the art director Andrew Mazzei. The film proved to be one of the hits of the year at the British box office.

Sequels
In 1927 Edwards starred in a sequel The Further Adventures of the Flag Lieutenant. The play was adapted into a film again in 1932, also starring Edwards.

Cast
 Henry Edwards as Dicky Lascelles 
 Lilian Oldland as Sybil Wynne 
 Dorothy Seacombe as Mrs Cameron 
 Fred Raynham as Major Thesiger 
 Fewlass Llewellyn as Admiral Wynne 
 Hayford Hobbs as D'Arcy Penrose 
 Forrester Harvey as Dusty Miller 
 Humberston Wright as Stiffy Steele

References

Bibliography
 Richards, Jeffrey (ed.). The Unknown 1930s: An Alternative History of the British Cinema, 1929- 1939. I.B. Tauris & Co, 1998.

External links

1926 films
British silent feature films
British war films
1920s English-language films
Films directed by Maurice Elvey
British black-and-white films
1926 war films
1920s British films